The Oberfrankenhalle is a multi-purpose indoor sporting arena that is located in Bayreuth, Germany. It is a part of the Bayreuth Sports Park, which also includes the Hans-Walter-Wild-Stadion football stadium, an ice rink, and an indoor pool. The arena is mainly used to host basketball, handball, and volleyball games, boxing matches, concerts and congresses. The seating capacity of the arena for basketball games is 4,000.

History
The opening of the hall took place on 29 October 1988. The arena has been used as the regular home arena of the German League basketball club Medi bayreuth.

References

External links
Oberfrankenhalle Arena at Medi Bayreuth's official website 
Image 1 of Oberfrankenhalle Interior
Image 2 of Oberfrankenhalle Interior
Image 3 of Oberfrankenhalle Interior
Image 4 of Oberfrankenhalle Interior

Basketball venues in Germany
Boxing venues in Germany
Buildings and structures in Bayreuth
Handball venues in Germany
Indoor arenas in Germany
Sports venues completed in 1988
Volleyball venues in Germany
Sports venues in Bavaria
Sport in Upper Franconia